Moratorium (from Late Latin morātōrium, neuter of morātōrius, "delaying"), may refer to:

Law
Moratorium (law), a delay or suspension of an activity or a law

Music
"Moratorium", a song by Alanis Morissette on her album Flavors of Entanglement
"Moratorium", a song by Band-Maid on their album Just Bring It

Protests
 Black Moratorium, January 1972 Indigenous rights protest in Australia
Moratorium to End the War in Vietnam, demonstrations against the Vietnam War held in the United States and Australia in 1969

Other uses
2010 United States deepwater drilling moratorium, a six-month suspension following a catastrophic oil spill in the Gulf of Mexico
Debt moratorium, delay allowed in repayment of debts
July Moratorium, a period with limited activity in the National Basketball Association (NBA) before their salary cap is announced
Moratorium (entertainment), the practice of suspending sales of home videos by the distributors
United Nations moratorium on the death penalty, 2007/8 resolutions of the UN